Omma Poom, or Mother's Arms, park is the first South Korean memorial dedicated to South Korean children who became adoptees. "It was conceived in conjunction with Me & Korea, an organization supporting Korean adoptees in the US."

External links

References 

Parks in Gyeonggi Province